Idan Vered (born 25 May 1989) is an Israeli professional footballer who plays as a winger for Hapoel Petah Tikva .

Early life
Vered was born and raised in Ramat Gan, Israel, to an Israeli family of Jewish descent.

Club career
Vered played entire career in Israel with Hakoah Amidar Ramat Gan, Beitar Jerusalem and Maccabi Haifa before coming to the Serbian SuperLiga club Red Star Belgrade in June 2015.

In June 2021, Vered joined Beitar Jerusalem's rivals Hapoel Tel Aviv.

International career
Vered got his first call up to the senior Israel national team for a 2018 FIFA World Cup qualifier against Macedonia in October 2016.

Career statistics

Honours

Club
Beitar Jerusalem
Israeli Premier League: 2007–08
Toto Cup Al: 2008, 2009

Maccabi Haifa
Israeli Premier League: 2010–11

Red Star Belgrade
Serbian SuperLiga: 2015–16

See also 
 List of Jewish footballers
 List of Jews in sports
 List of Israelis

References

External links
 ONE profile 

1987 births
Living people
Israeli Jews
Israeli footballers
Jewish footballers
Association football forwards
Hakoah Maccabi Amidar Ramat Gan F.C. players
Beitar Jerusalem F.C. players
Maccabi Haifa F.C. players
Red Star Belgrade footballers
Ottawa Fury FC players
Hapoel Tel Aviv F.C. players
Hapoel Petah Tikva F.C. players
Liga Leumit players
Israeli Premier League players
Serbian SuperLiga players
North American Soccer League players
Footballers from Ramat Gan
Israeli people of Romanian-Jewish descent
Israeli expatriate footballers
Expatriate footballers in Serbia
Expatriate soccer players in Canada
Israeli expatriate sportspeople in Serbia
Israeli expatriate sportspeople in Canada